Tevzana  is a rural locality (a selo) in Vedensky District, Chechnya.

Administrative and municipal status 
Municipally, Tevzana is incorporated as Tevzaninskoye rural settlement. It is the administrative center of the municipality and is the only settlement included in it.

Geography 

Tevzana is located on the left bank of the Dzhalka River, opposite the village of Makhkety.

The nearest settlements to Tevzana are Agishty in the north, Makhkety in the south, and Elistanzhi and Khattuni in the east..

History 
In 1944, after the genocide and deportation of the Chechen and Ingush people and the Chechen-Ingush ASSR was abolished, the village of Tevzana was renamed to Kirov-Aul, and settled by people from the neighboring republic of Dagestan. From 1944 to 1957, it was a part of the Vedensky District of the Dagestan ASSR.

In 1958, after the Vaynakh people returned and the Chechen-Ingush ASSR was restored, the village was renamed again to Kirov-Yurt. In the 1990s, the village finally regained its old name, Tevzana.

Teip composition 
People of the following teips (clans) live in Tevzana:

 Chebarloy - around 40% of the village's population,
 Elistanzhkhoy - around 35% of the village's population,
 Tsadakhaaroy - around 10% of the village's population,
 Ghezaloy - around 5% of the village's population,
 Chermoy,
 Sharoy,
 Tsamdoy,
 Zumsoy,
 Nashkhoy,
 Akkiy,
 Andiy,
 Tsikaroy.

Population 
 1990 Census: 2,007
 2002 Census: 1,991
 2010 Census: 3,378
 2019 estimate: 3,577

According to the results of the 2010 Census, the majority of residents of Tevzana were ethnic Chechens.

References 

Rural localities in Vedensky District